Frank Radice is a television industry executive, businessman and author.  He resides in New York City and London, England.

Radice currently serves as Managing Partner of VIDA F.R. Company, a promotion, marketing, media, and consulting firm with offices in New York City, Los Angeles, and London.  Radice also serves as the Expert-in-Residence at Definition 6, an Atlanta-based unified digital marketing agency .  He is also the Creative Adviser to Thought Development and ON-AIR Pro. Radice is a Member, Directors Guild of America (DGA), Writer/Member, Broadcast Music Incorporated (BMI) and on the Executive Advisory Board for the Broadway Walk of Stars.

Television Career (1972-2009) 

Frank Radice was President and Chief Marketing Officer of the National Academy of Television Arts & Sciences (NATAS) where he added a new category of National Emmy Award for Promotional Announcements and transacted a deal with Associated Television International to broadcast the Daytime Emmy’s on the CW.

From 1973 to 1991, Radice was a producer at ABC News for Nightline, World News Tonight, Good Morning America and The Last Word.

At NBC, Radice was an executive vice president who helped develop the "NBC News: America's News Leader" campaign.

In 2007, he oversaw the marketing of “Where in the World is Matt Lauer?" which became a successful online NBC Today Show franchise and was sold to Hyundai Motors under a sponsorship agreement. Radice also coordinated a deal agreement between NBC Universal and Procter & Gamble that launched petside.com a web site catering to the pet industry.

Book Publishing Career 

In 2006, Frank and his wife, Vida, co-wrote "Sam Katz on the Loose" a pop-up children's book illustrated by Charles Fazzino and published by Random House.

Music 
Radice is a musician, songwriter and composer. During his early years, he sang and played guitar in several rock and blues bands including The Righteous Brothers, Peaches & Herb, The Phil Flowers Band and Sideshow. Later in his career, Radice co-wrote the “America’s First Family” theme, and was Executive Producer of the Emmy nominated “Live For Today” and "Why I Love Today" themes, all for NBC’s Today Show.

In 2008, Frank worked with the legendary composer and producer, David Foster, and "Band from TV", on 2 cuts for the CD release of the music from the hit television series House M.D. with proceeds benefiting various charities on the House M.D. Original Television Soundtrack.

References

Sources
 
 Nexttv | Programming| Business | Multichannel Broadcasting + Cable | www.nexttv.com
 Where on the Web Is Matt Lauer?
 To Promote a Cable Network, a Plan to Inundate the Internet

External links 
 FrankRadice.com

American telecommunications industry businesspeople
Living people
1949 births
Bethesda-Chevy Chase High School alumni
University of Maryland, College Park alumni